The 2005 Swedish Touring Car Championship season was the 10th Swedish Touring Car Championship (STCC) season. In total eight racing weekends at six different circuits were held; each round comprising three races, making a twenty-four round competition in total.

Changes for 2005
 The race format of qualifying and two races per weekend were removed. Instead two short sprints would be raced, and the combined results of those two races would determine the grid for the third, longer race. 
 Points were awarded to the top six grid positions for the long race (the six drivers that succeeded the most in the qualification races): 6-5-4-3-2-1.
 The longer race gave points by the system 20-17-14-11-9-7-5-3-2-1.
 Grid positions for the first qualification race was decided by randomly drawing the driver's starting numbers from a cup. This grid was then reversed for the second qualification race. The drawings were later replaced by a one-lap shootout for the quickest time after teams put pressure on the organisation.
 Extra ballast weight were given to the top four drivers of the championship and the top four long race winners by the system 1st: +20 kg, 2nd: +15 kg, 3rd: +10 kg and 4th: +5 kg. Maximum extra weight was set to 40 kg. Weight gained from the long race stayed for one weekend after the gaining of the weight and was then removed from the car.
 Tyres were limited to 20 slick tyres per weekend, whereof 8 of these 20 were allowed to be new tyres.
 TV coverage was extended, with Viasat Sport/ZTV covering three and a half hours live action from each race weekend
 STCC AB had a board change. Mike Luff, Sven-Göte Svensson, Håkan Junfors and Lars Frisell were replaced by Tommy Theorin, Joakim Wiedesheim and Christer Johansson.

Teams and drivers

Race calendar and winners

Championship results

Championship Standings

Driver's championship

STCC Challenge

Manufacturer's championship

References

Swedish Touring Car Championship seasons
Swedish Touring Car Championship
Swedish Touring Car Championship season